Posht Jub (also Romanized as Posht Jūb; also known as Pusht-i-Ja) is a village in Goli Jan Rural District, in the Central District of Tonekabon County, Mazandaran Province, Iran. At the 2006 census, its population was 166, in 46 families.

References 

Populated places in Tonekabon County